Luv Is is a 2023 Philippine television drama romance anthology show broadcast by GMA Network. It premiered on January 16, 2023 on the network's Telebabad line up replacing Mano Po Legacy: The Flower Sisters.

Cast and characters
Caught in His Arms
 Sofia Pablo as Florencia "Florence" dela Cruz / Celestina Almero
 Allen Ansay as Nero Sebastian Ferell
 Michael Sager as Sean Owen Ferell
 Raheel Bhyria as Aldus Raphael Ferell
 Sean Lucas as Troy Alvis Ferell
 Vince Maristela as Tristan Matteo Ferell
 Caitlyn Stave as Antonia Scarlett Fuentes
 Cheska Fausto as Camille Cortez Villarico
 Kirsten Gonzales as Linnalyn Isabelle "Lina" Hidalgo
 Tanya Ramos as Aira Samson Rivera
 Ariel Ureta as Don Garpido Ferell (LG - Lolo Garp)
 Audie Gemora as Don Rogelio Almero
 Debraliz Valasote as Serafica
 Gio Alvarez as Federico dela Cruz
 Boom Labrusca as Dencio
 Denise Joaquin as Lydia dela Cruz
 Rain Matienzo as Ashley Abadiano
 Bobby Andrews as Lorenzo Almero
 Ingrid dela Paz as Alyanna Almero
 Patani Daño as Patutina
 JR Reyes as Iking
 James Marco as James
 Leo Enerio as Baste
 Maritess Joaquin as Doña Amanda
 Dion Ignacio as Samuel Almero         

Love at First Read
 Mavy Legaspi as Kudos Pereseo 
 Kyline Alcantara as AB C. De Makapili
 Larkin Castor as Shield Pereseo
 Bruce Roeland as Risk Pereseo
 Josh Ford as Train 
 Pam Prinster as Hazel
 Kiel Gueco as Psalm Pereseo 
 Gabby Gueco as Philemon Pereseo

Episodes
<onlyinclude>

References

External links
 
 

2023 Philippine television series debuts
Filipino-language television shows
GMA Network original programming
Philippine romance television series
Television shows set in the Philippines